DP World Lions is a professional cricket team in Johannesburg, Gauteng. The home venue is the DP World Wanderers Stadium.   

The team plays in the CSA 4-Day Series first class cricket competition as well as in the Momentum 1 Day Cup,  CSA Provincial T20 Knock-Out Competition and CSA T20 Challenge limited over competitions.

Honours since the 2004/2005 season
CSA 4 Day Domestic Series (3)
2014–15, 2018–19, 2019–20
Momentum One Day Cup (3)
2012–13 (shared with Nashua Cape Cobras), 2015–16, 2020-21 (shared with the Hollywoodbets Dolphins) 
2021-22 CSA One-Day Cup
Betway T20 Challenge (4)
2006–07, 2012–13, 2018–19, 2020-21 
Champions League Twenty20
Runners-up: 2012

Squad

 Bold denotes players with international caps.

References

Sources
 South African Cricket Annual – various editions
 Wisden Cricketers' Almanack – various editions

2003 establishments in South Africa
South African first-class cricket teams
Cricket in North West (South African province)
Cricket in Gauteng
Cricket clubs established in 2003
Sport in Johannesburg